is a Japanese football player. He plays for Zweigen Kanazawa.

Club statistics
Updated to end of 2018 season.

References

External links

Profile at Vegalta Sendai
Profile at Zweigen Kanazawa

1993 births
Living people
Association football people from Iwate Prefecture
Japanese footballers
J1 League players
J2 League players
J3 League players
Vegalta Sendai players
J.League U-22 Selection players
Zweigen Kanazawa players
Association football midfielders